Kedron State High School is a Queensland public secondary school which is located in the inner-northern suburb of Kedron in Brisbane, Australia. The school was opened in 1956, to meet the needs of the rapidly expanding North Brisbane population whose children were members of the post-World War II baby boomer generation.

Kedron is a co-educational and non-denominational school, renowned in Brisbane for offering a Special Education Unit for hearing-impaired students and also for its accredited International Students Program.

In 2007 the school joined the Healthy State system and removed a large proportion of junk food including all soft drinks.

In an effort to increase student voice in the school the 'Kedron Connect' program was announced by acting deputy principal for middle school in February 2023.

History 
Originally inhabited by the Aboriginal Enoggera tribe, the site was also owned by Queensland's first Resident Judge, Alfred Lutwyche. From the 1880s onward it was used as a racecourse which was later partially owned by businessman John Wren in 1912.

Kedron was established in 1956; the school derives its name from the Kidron Valley mentioned in the Bible and located in Palestine. Over the years, enrolment has ranged from 274 students in 1956 to 1700 in 1976. Since its inception, almost 20 000 students have attended Kedron. A language census conducted in 2003 revealed 38 languages were spoken within the school community.

On the last week of the third term of the year, Kedron celebrates a week called 'Kedron Week' where everyday, for one week, assemblies and activities are held to celebrate the many different cultures represented in the school. The school has highly multi-cultural students from foreign countries greet the school on assembles in their own national language. Music, dancing, races, games and stories are usually put to show.

In 2006, Kedron celebrated their 50th anniversary and in 2016, their 60th.

International student program
Kedron makes use of their substantial language and (EAL/D) program to provide homestays to international students as well as offering full enrolments as part of EQI (Education Queensland International). In partner with their sister school located in Japan, Kedron accommodates over 50 students a year from a range of different countries including Japan, Samoa & Germany and offers facilities such 
as a international student hub.

Student achievements 

Kedron is a traditional school which focusses primarily on scholastic excellence. Its students have achieved High Distinctions, Distinctions and Credits in Australasian Schools Competitions run by the University of New South Wales in English, Computer Science & Literacy, Science and Writing, and various other competitions. There have also been pupils selected to attend the National Youth Science Forum in Canberra and national winners in the National History Challenge.

Kedron's Queensland Core Skills Test (QCS) preparation program has proven highly effective with 8 students in 2009 achieving an Overall Position (OP) of 1, the highest possible rank in the state.

In 1975, a Kedron band travelled to Longreach to play at the opening of the Stockman's Hall of Fame. They were followed 30 years later by a new generation of Kedron musicians to play at an anniversary celebration of the Hall's opening.

As of 2007, a Kedron student has become the third in three years to win the Pierre de Coubertin Award for sporting excellence, an initiative of the Australian Olympic Committee.

The school participated in the 2022 Year 12 Queensland Debating Union where they beat Brisbane Girls Grammar School in the grand final.

Sporting houses 
Kedron State High School has four sporting houses each representing a distinct colour in which students are assigned to and represent during in-school sporting events.
Wickham (Green)
Lutwyche (Blue)
Bowen (Black)
Griffith (Red)

Notable alumni 
 Kenneth Wiltshire – professor at the University of Queensland
 Rowena Wallace – actress
 Jason Barry-Smith – opera singer
 David Nilsson – baseball player, previous owner of Baseball Australia and manager of the Brisbane Bandits (2014–2015)
 Bonny Barry – Labor Member for Aspley in the Legislative Assembly of Queensland
 Aliir Aliir – Sydney Swans Footballer
 Ally Anderson – Women's Brisbane Lions Footballer

Past principals

Deputy principals 
There are five deputy principals at Kedron State High School:
 L. Miller (Junior School) 
 Z. Wilson (Acting) (Middle School) 
 T. Buckley (Senior School)
 S. Kiss (Student Enhancement and Support)
 K. Smith (Organisational Capabilities)

References

Footnotes
  Education Queensland International schools (2003).Official EQI website
  Australian Deafness Directory (2005).Listing in Directory
  Kedron State High School – About Kedron (2004).School Vision and Purpose

Educational institutions established in 1956
Public high schools in Brisbane
Kedron, Queensland
1956 establishments in Australia